Marine Lines is a locality in South Mumbai. The name Marine Lines is derived from the Marine Battalion Lines, a military establishment built by the British in the 19th century. The battalion was later converted to an air force residential quarters, and now lies just south of Metro Adlabs. It is also the name of a railway station on the Mumbai suburban railway on the Western Railway railway line. Marine Lines was also the name of the road on which Bombay Hospital and Liberty Cinema stand. It is now known as V Thackersey Marg.  Marine Drive is the famous promenade near the station. Marine Drive has one of the finest Art Deco Residential Buildings facing the sea. Built in 1951, it is India's oldest aquarium and is named after Parsi entrepreneur DB Taraporewala, who provided funds for its development. Marine Drive is one of the greatest sites to see the monsoon in Mumbai if you're travelling during the rainy season.

Near the station there is a Muslim cemetery and a municipal crematorium; Chandanwadi. Adjoining the station is the famous Marine Drive flyover; the only link to Marine Drive over the tracks from Princess Street beginning to end. Marine Drive/Marine lines is also known as the Queen's Necklace because the street lights resemble a string of pearls in a necklace when viewed at night from an elevation location anywhere along the drive. Signage makes UNESCO tag visible at Marine Drive

New Marine Lines is the area just south of the station near Churchgate. It is home to a number of offices including the UTI, R.O.C. (Registrar of Companies), Customs (Marine and Preventive Wing), Income Tax office and various other Governmental agencies.

Religious places
 Ambe Mata temple
 The Church of Our Lady of Seven Dolours
 Hanuman Temple at Picket Road
 Kalbadevi Temple
 Gol Masjid

Schools and colleges
St. Xavier's College, Bombay
Our Lady of Dolours High School
HVB Academy
Beramjee Jeejeebhoy Parsee Charitable Institution
Elphinstone School

Literature and Popular Culture
" ... at Mrs Inverarity’s house in Marine Lines." From Rudyard Kipling's short story, Baa Baa Black Sheep, published 1888.

See also
List of city districts by population density

References 

Neighbourhoods in Mumbai